Goraszowice  is a village in the administrative district of Gmina Otmuchów, within Nysa County, Opole Voivodeship, in south-western Poland, close to the Czech border. The village has a population of 90.

References

Goraszowice